Ingamells is a surname. Notable people with the surname include:

Bob Ingamells (1914–1986), Australian politician
John Ingamells (1934–2013), British art historian and writer
Rex Ingamells (1913–1955), Australian poet
Thomas Ingamells (born 1982), British DJ and record producer